Romsey railway station serves the town of Romsey in Hampshire, England. The station is a Grade II listed building.

History
Romsey station was built by the London and South Western Railway on its line from Eastleigh to Salisbury and opened on 1 March 1847. The subway connecting the two platforms was added in 1887. The waiting room has a collection of framed photographs from earliest times through to the mid-20th century. The signal box has been preserved and can be visited.

The Andover line fell victim to the Beeching Axe in September 1964, and the Eastleigh route closed to passengers in May 1969. The Eastleigh line remained open for freight traffic and as a diversionary route. The line to Eastleigh via Chandlers Ford regained regular passenger services in May 2003.

Previously managed by Great Western Railway, the station was transferred to South Western Railway in April 2020.

Services
Care needs to be taken when consulting the on-platform electronic displays - a train indicated to Redbridge will call first at Chandlers Ford and then become a train to Salisbury as it travels around the loop. Similarly a train indicated to Chandlers Ford will call first at Redbridge and then travel around the loop back to Romsey.

Great Western Railway runs services south-eastward to Southampton Central, Portsmouth Harbour, and north-westward to Salisbury, Bristol Temple Meads, Worcester Foregate Street, and Cardiff Central.

References

External links

Three Rivers Rail Partnership

Railway stations in Hampshire
DfT Category E stations
Former London and South Western Railway stations
Railway stations in Great Britain opened in 1847
Railway stations served by Great Western Railway
Railway stations served by South Western Railway
1847 establishments in England
Romsey